The 16th Independent Spirit Awards, honoring the best in independent filmmaking for 2000, were announced on March 24, 2001.  It was hosted by John Waters.

Winners and nominees

{| class="wikitable"
!Best Feature
!Best Director
|-
|Crouching Tiger, Hidden Dragon

Before Night Falls
George Washington
Ghost Dog: The Way of the Samurai
Requiem for a Dream
| Ang Lee – Crouching Tiger, Hidden Dragon
Darren Aronofsky – Requiem for a Dream
Miguel Arteta – Chuck & Buck
Christopher Guest – Best in Show
Julian Schnabel – Before Night Falls
|-
!Best Male Lead
!Best Female Lead
|-
|Javier Bardem – Before Night FallsAdrien Brody – RestaurantBilly Crudup – Jesus’ SonHill Harper – The VisitMark Ruffalo – You Can Count on Me|Ellen Burstyn – Requiem for a Dream
Joan Allen – The ContenderSanaa Lathan – Love & BasketballLaura Linney – You Can Count on MeKelly Macdonald – Two Family House|-
!Best Supporting Male
!Best Supporting Female
|-
|Willem Dafoe – Shadow of the Vampire

Cole Hauser – TigerlandGary Oldman – The ContenderGiovanni Ribisi – The GiftBilly Dee Williams – The Visit|Zhang Ziyi – Crouching Tiger, Hidden Dragon
Pat Caroll – SongcatcherJennifer Connelly – Requiem for a DreamMarcia Gay Harden – PollockLupe Ontiveros – Chuck & Buck|-
!Best Screenplay
!Best First Screenplay
|-
|You Can Count on Me – Kenneth LonerganChuck & Buck – Mike White
Love & Sex – Valerie Breiman
Two Family House – Raymond De Felitta
Waking the Dead – Robert Dillon
|Love & Basketball – Gina Prince-BythewoodBoiler Room – Ben Younger
George Washington – David Gordon Green
Tigerland – Ross Klavan and Michael McGruther
The Visit – Jordan Walker-Pearlman
|-
!Best First Feature
!Best Debut Performance
|-
|You Can Count on MeBoiler RoomGirlfightLove & BasketballThe Visit|Michelle Rodriguez – Girlfight
 Curtis Cotton III, Candace Evanofski, Rachael Handy, Donald Holden and Damian Jewan Lee – George WashingtonRory Culkin – You Can Count on MeEmmy Rossum – SongcatcherMike White – Chuck & Buck 
|-
!Best Cinematography
!Best Documentary
|-
|Requiem for a Dream – Matthew LibatiqueBefore Night Falls – Xavier Pérez Grobet and Guillermo Rosas
George Washington – Tim Orr
Hamlet – John de Borman
Shadow of the Vampire – Lou Bogue
|Dark DaysThe Eyes of Tammy Faye
Long Night's Journey into Day
Paragraph 175
Sound and Fury
|-
! colspan="2" | Best International Film
|-
| colspan="2" valign="top" |Dancer in the Dark • DenmarkIn the Mood for Love • Hong Kong/FranceMalli • IndiaA Time for Drunken Horses • IranThe War Zone • UK
|}

 Special awards 
John Cassavetes Award

Chuck & Buck

 Bunny Everything Put Together Groove Our SongTruer Than Fiction Award

Keep the River on Your Right: A Modern Cannibal TaleBenjamin SmokeJust, Melvin: Just EvilPie in the Sky: The Brigid Berlin StoryProducers Award

Paul Mezey – The Ballad of Ramblin’ Jack and Spring Forward
Jim McKay – American Movie and Our SongTim Perell – Louis & Frank and The Myth of FingerprintsDiana E. Williams – The Love Machine and Our SongSomeone to Watch Award

Marc Forster – Everything Put Together
Dan McCormack – Other Voices 
Mia Trachinger – Bunny''

Films with multiple nominations and awards

References

External links 
2000 Spirit Awards at IMDb
Official ceremony on YouTube

2000
Independent Spirit Awards